James Gwilt (born 11 August 1986) is a former professional Australian rules footballer who played with the St Kilda Football Club and the Essendon Football Club in the Australian Football League (AFL).

Early life
Gwilt's mother is from Papua New Guinea and his father, Jason, is of Welsh descent and immigrated with his parents and siblings from Crowle (Worcestershire) in England to Australia in the late 1950s. Jason Gwilt played Australian rules football in Port Moresby.

Gwilt began his football in suburban football instead of participating in the TAC Cup, Victoria's premier under-18 competition. He played for Noble Park in the Eastern Football League and was best on ground in the league's grand final in 2004. He was also a talented junior cricketer, and played for the South Melbourne Cricket Club first XI in premier cricket during the 2003-04 season.

AFL career
St Kilda made a surprising pick in the 2004 AFL National Draft by selecting Gwilt in the 4th Round, the first player selected from a suburban league for five years. At debut he was only one of two AFL players (the other being Mal Michael) to have a Papua New Guinean parent.

Gwilt played in the 2005 AFL finals series, impressing with two goals against Adelaide in a qualifying final win at Football Park (AAMI Stadium) in Adelaide.

Gwilt spent most of 2006 playing with St Kilda's then VFL affiliate team, the Casey Scorpions. He returned with a total of eight games in 2007, with his best being a 21 possession game against Carlton at Docklands Stadium. He was nominated for the AFL's Army Award in Round 11 of that year. Gwilt struggled for opportunities early in 2008 but returned to the senior side in Round 11. He enjoyed better form after being played as a forward, including a good performance in St Kilda's 2008 semifinal win against Collingwood.

Gwilt played in 15 of 22 matches in the 2009 season home and away rounds in which St Kilda qualified in first position for the finals, winning the club’s third minor premiership.

Gwilt played 26 games in 2010, including four final matches, and finished 8th in St Kilda's best & fairest award (Trevor Barker Medal). This was the year that Gwilt entrenched himself inside St Kilda's best 22, as shown by his high finish in St Kilda's best & fairest award. Prior to 2010 he was considered a fringe player.

Gwilt played as a cog in St Kilda's defence until the end of 2014, where, despite a 10th-place finish in the club's best and fairest, he was delisted as part of the club's youth policy. At the end of the 2016 season, he was informed his contract would not be renewed for 2017.

Statistics

|- style="background-color: #EAEAEA"
! scope="row" style="text-align:center" | 2005
|
| 33 || 3 || 2 || 2 || 25 || 6 || 31 || 10 || 5 || 0.7 || 0.7 || 8.3 || 2.0 || 10.3 || 3.3 || 1.7
|-
! scope="row" style="text-align:center" | 2006
|
| 33 || 2 || 0 || 0 || 5 || 12 || 17 || 2 || 8 || 0.0 || 0.0 || 2.5 || 6.0 || 8.5 || 1.0 || 4.0
|- style="background-color: #EAEAEA"
! scope="row" style="text-align:center" | 2007
|
| 33 || 8 || 1 || 0 || 82 || 33 || 115 || 44 || 11 || 0.1 || 0.0 || 10.3 || 4.1 || 14.4 || 5.5 || 1.4
|-
! scope="row" style="text-align:center" | 2008
|
| 33 || 13 || 3 || 3 || 84 || 67 || 151 || 51 || 24 || 0.2 || 0.2 || 6.5 || 5.2 || 11.6 || 3.9 || 1.8
|- style="background-color: #EAEAEA"
! scope="row" style="text-align:center" | 2009
|
| 33 || 15 || 8 || 6 || 97 || 98 || 195 || 55 || 40 || 0.5 || 0.4 || 6.5 || 6.5 || 13.0 || 3.7 || 2.7
|-
! scope="row" style="text-align:center" | 2010
|
| 33 || 26 || 5 || 1 || 336 || 174 || 510 || 151 || 40 || 0.2 || 0.0 || 12.9 || 6.7 || 19.6 || 5.8 || 1.5
|- style="background-color: #EAEAEA"
! scope="row" style="text-align:center" | 2011
|
| 33 || 15 || 0 || 0 || 201 || 82 || 283 || 82 || 18 || 0.0 || 0.0 || 13.4 || 5.5 || 18.9 || 5.5 || 1.2
|-
! scope="row" style="text-align:center" | 2012
|
| 33 || 14 || 0 || 1 || 143 || 63 || 206 || 44 || 21 || 0.0 || 0.1 || 10.2 || 4.5 || 14.7 || 3.1 || 1.5
|- style="background-color: #EAEAEA"
! scope="row" style="text-align:center" | 2013
|
| 33 || 13 || 0 || 0 || 119 || 75 || 194 || 54 || 14 || 0.0 || 0.0 || 9.2 || 5.8 || 14.9 || 4.2 || 1.1
|-
! scope="row" style="text-align:center" | 2014
|
| 33 || 17 || 6 || 2 || 190 || 85 || 275 || 108 || 35 || 0.4 || 0.1 || 11.2 || 5.0 || 16.2 || 6.4 || 2.1
|- style="background:#eaeaea;"
! scope="row" style="text-align:center" | 2015
|
| 42 || 11 || 0 || 1 || 123 || 80 || 203 || 59 || 17 || 0.0 || 0.1 || 11.2 || 7.3 || 18.5 || 5.4 || 1.5
|-
! scope="row" style="text-align:center" | 2016
|
| 42 || 15 || 0 || 0 || 185 || 104 || 289 || 93 || 23 || 0.0 || 0.0 || 12.3 || 6.9 || 19.3 || 6.2 || 1.5
|- class="sortbottom"
! colspan=3| Career
! 152
! 25
! 16
! 1590
! 879
! 2469
! 753
! 256
! 0.2
! 0.1
! 10.5
! 5.8
! 16.2
! 5.0
! 1.7
|}

References

External links

1986 births
Living people
Australian rules footballers from Victoria (Australia)
St Kilda Football Club players
Essendon Football Club players
Casey Demons players
Australian people of Papua New Guinean descent
Australian people of Welsh descent
Sandringham Football Club players
Papua New Guinean players of Australian rules football